Burlada is a municipality in Navarre province, Spain on the outskirts of the city of Pamplona.

References

External links
City Council of Burlada-Burlata
 BURLADA - BURLATA in the Bernardo Estornés Lasa - Auñamendi Encyclopedia (Euskomedia Fundazioa) 

Municipalities in Navarre